Biloxi Blues is a 1988 American military comedy-drama film directed by Mike Nichols, written by Neil Simon, and starring Matthew Broderick and Christopher Walken.

Simon adapted his semi-autobiographical 1984 play of the same title, the second chapter in what is known as the Eugene trilogy, the first being Brighton Beach Memoirs and the third being Broadway Bound.

Plot
During World War II, Jewish teenager Eugene Jerome of Brooklyn is drafted into the United States Army. Jerome sets three goals—lose his virginity, survive the war, and become a writer. He is sent to basic training at Keesler Field near Biloxi, Mississippi. Jerome keeps a journal to record his impressions of his fellow draftees. The new privates are trained by Sergeant Toomey, a wounded veteran with a steel plate in his head. Toomey imposes arbitrary rules and metes out harsh punishments.

A recruit named Epstein refuses to accept Toomey's authority. Toomey imposes increasingly harsh punishments in an effort to break him, but Epstein refuses to compromise. While the other privates try to avoid Toomey's ire, they admire Epstein's determination. Toomey also eventually comes to respect Epstein's refusal to submit. One evening, Jerome proposes that each man share his fantasy of how he would spend his final days if he had only a week to live. They each pay five dollars, and Jerome agrees to judge the stories and pick a winner. Jerome chooses Epstein's fantasy of making Toomey do 200 push-ups. The men argue about Jerome's selection and Wykowski makes Anti-Semitic remarks, which leads to a confrontation between him and Epstein. Toomey ends it, but Jerome feels badly for not defending Epstein.

When the soldiers are about to go on a two-day leave, Wykowski reports that his money has been stolen. Toomey demands that the thief step forward and Epstein places money on Wykowski's footlocker. Toomey then reveals that he took Wykowski's money to teach Wykowski a lesson about securing his valuables. Epstein is confined to the barracks for having falsely confessed and tells Jerome that he did it because he was sure to be punished anyway, since Toomey wants to break him. Jerome accomplishes one goal when he has sex with Rowena, a prostitute. The platoon arrives back at the barracks before Jerome, where they discover his journal, take turns reading it aloud, and learn Jerome's private thoughts about them. When Jerome arrives, he realizes the journal is missing and Wykowski resumes reading from it. Epstein discovers that Jerome believes Epstein is gay.

Toomey enters the barracks in the middle of the night and reports that two soldiers were caught having sex in the latrine, but one escaped. Toomey wants the guilty party to step forward. When no one does, he suspends everyone's privileges and weekend leave. The soldiers believe the man who got away was Epstein, giving Jerome a lesson in the power of the written word. The next morning, Toomey reports that the man who escaped was Hennesey, whom everyone likes, and no one suspected was gay. The platoon later learns that Hennesey was sentenced to three months confinement, followed by a dishonorable discharge.

Jerome meets Daisy Hannigan, a beautiful, smart Catholic girl from Gulfport. He leaves camp whenever he can so they can see each other, and he confesses his love right before leaving Camp Shelby for his first duty assignment. Jerome admits to the audience that the chances of seeing Daisy again after the war are slim, but that knowing he has a girl waiting back home motivates him to survive the war.

Near the end of the platoon's training, Toomey gets drunk because he has an upcoming appointment at a veterans hospital and believes he will be discharged for disability. Preferring prison to being discharged, he calls for Jerome, whom he holds at gunpoint in a final effort to compel him to follow orders by making Jerome turn him in for his misdeeds. Jerome calls in the rest of the platoon to serve as witnesses. Toomey is aware of the story contest Epstein won and accepts Epstein's offer not to press charges in exchange for Toomey completing 200 push-ups.

As his fellow privates sleep on a train while en route to their next duty stations, Jerome informs the audience of the destiny of each. He concludes by telling the audience that he accomplished his second goal of surviving the war and his third goal of becoming an author, although his path to success was different than what he expected.

Cast
 Matthew Broderick as Private Eugene Morris Jerome
 Christopher Walken as Technical Sergeant Merwin J. Toomey
 Markus Flanagan as Private Roy W. Selridge
 Matt Mulhern as Private Joseph T. Wykowski
 Corey Parker as Private Arnold B. Epstein
 Casey Siemaszko as Private Donald J. Carney
 Michael Dolan as Private James J. Hennesey
 Penelope Ann Miller as Daisy Hannigan
 Park Overall as Rowena
Reprising their stage roles in the movie were Broderick, Miller, Mulhern, and Overall.

Soundtrack
Period songs heard on the soundtrack include:
 "How High the Moon" by Morgan Lewis and Nancy Hamilton
 "Blue Moon" by Richard Rodgers and Lorenz Hart
 "Marie" by Irving Berlin
 "Solitude" by Duke Ellington, Irving Mills, and Edgar DeLange
 "Chattanooga Choo Choo" by Harry Warren and Mack Gordon
 "Don't Sit Under the Apple Tree (With Anyone Else but Me)" by Sam H. Stept, Charles Tobias, and Lew Brown
 "Goodbye Dear, I'll Be Back in a Year" by Mack Kay
 "Memories of You" performed by Benny Goodman

Reception

Critical response
On Rotten Tomatoes, the film has an approval rating of 75% based on reviews from 28 critics, with an average rating of 6.5/10. On Metacritic, the film has a score of 61% based on reviews from 15 critics, indicating "generally favorable reviews". Audiences polled by CinemaScore gave the film an average grade of "A-" on an A+ to F scale.

Vincent Canby of The New York Times called the film "a very classy movie, directed and toned up by Mike Nichols so there's not an ounce of fat in it. Mr. Nichols keeps the comedy small, precise and spare. Further, the humor is never flattened by the complex logistics of movie making, nor inflated to justify them". Rita Kempley of The Washington Post thought the film was "an endearing adaptation" and "overall Nichols, Simon and especially Broderick find fresh threads in the old fatigues" despite some "fallow spells and sugary interludes".

Variety called it "an agreeable but hardly inspired film" and added: "Even with high-powered talents Mike Nichols and Matthew Broderick aboard, [the] World War II barracks comedy provokes just mild laughs and smiles rather than the guffaws Simon's work often elicits in the theater".

Roger Ebert of the Chicago Sun-Times called the film "pale, shallow, unconvincing and predictable" and added, "nothing in this movie seems fresh, well-observed, deeply felt or even much thought about ... It's just a series of setups and camera moves and limp dialogue and stock characters who are dragged on to do their business".

Box office
The film opened on 1,239 screens in the US and earned $7,093,325 on its opening weekend, ranking No. 1 at the box office. It eventually grossed $43,184,798 in the US and $8,500,000 in other markets for a total worldwide box office of $51,684,798.

References

External links
 
 
 
 
 

1988 films
1988 comedy-drama films
1988 LGBT-related films
American comedy-drama films
American films based on plays
Films about Jews and Judaism
Films about the United States Army
Films about virginity
Films based on works by Neil Simon
Films directed by Mike Nichols
Films scored by Georges Delerue
Films set in the 1940s
Films set in Mississippi
Films set on the home front during World War II
Films shot in Arkansas
Films shot in Kansas
Military humor in film
Films with screenplays by Neil Simon
Universal Pictures films
Works about Mississippi
1980s English-language films
1980s American films